"Let's Talk it over in the Ladies Room" is a song written by Peter Koelewijn, which became a 1984 Curtie and the Boombox hit.

Kikki Danielsson recorded the song with lyrics in Swedish by Ingela "Pling" Forsman, as "Vi låser dörren in till damernas", for the 1985 album Bra vibrationer. and as the song became considered a Kikki Danielsson song in Sweden, it was recorded by Lars Vegas trio on their 1993 EPKikki Resque.

Chart trajectories

References

1984 singles
Dutch pop songs
English-language Dutch songs
Kikki Danielsson songs
1984 songs
Songs written by Peter Koelewijn
Chrysalis Records singles